Illegal mining is mining activity that is undertaken without state permission, in particular in absence of land rights, mining licenses, and exploration or mineral transportation permits.

Illegal mining can be a subsistence activity, as is the case with artisanal mining, or it can belong to large-scale organized crime, spearheaded by illegal mining syndicates. On an international level, approximately 80 percent of small-scale mining operations can be categorized as illegal. Despite strategic developments towards "responsible mining," even big companies can be involved in illegal mineral digging and extraction, if only on the financing side.

Regional issues

Sub-Saharan Africa 
Spurred by widespread poverty and a lack of alternative income-earning opportunities, illegal artisanal mining is a well-documented phenomenon in sub-Saharan Africa. While legalization opportunities for artisanal and small scale mining are often available, inefficient government bureaucracy structures can make noncompliance more appealing for workers. In addition, in an effort to attract foreign investment, many governments in sub-Saharan Africa have loosened national mining investment codes. An expansion of the large-scale mining projects fueled by foreign investment has displaced rural mining communities, many of which revert to illegal mining on concessions given to the formal mining sector. As a response measure, Ghana for instance launched Operation Vanguard in 2017 to curb illegal artisanal mining in Ghana.

Latin America 
Illegal gold mining in Latin America is a particular concern because of the scale of organized crime and significant rate of environmental degradation (through mercury and other toxic chemicals routinely used in gold mining) that accompany it.

Illegal mining operations are often located in remote areas, making it more difficult to enforce mining standards. Furthermore, mining requirements can vary substantially from region to region, further complicating adherence with labor laws, environmental regulations, and tax legislation. Emissions of mercury originating in artisanal mining, most of which is unregulated and illegal, are substantial, contributing to 37 percent of the atmospheric mercury emitted annually.

While drug trafficking has historically been a prominent criminal enterprise, lower risks associated with illegal mining have propelled a shift toward lucrative illegal gold mining operations. In order to transfer illegal gold into the marketplace, criminal actors sometimes attempt to mask its illicit origins by melting together processed legal and illegal gold. This gold laundering task is generally facilitated by middlemen who falsify documentation to ease the transition into the legitimate international marketplace.

India

Nigeria 
Mining in Nigeria is one of the primary organizations in the country which prompts big time income. The development of the mining business of the Nigerian market will make more positions for inhabitants of the country.. Along these lines, there have beenissues of mining in Nigeria. 

The mining business is one of the main business in the country. Obviously, such a relentless interaction has a few troubles. The following is the rundown of the issues of mining industry in Nigeria 

1. Infrastructural hardships: This is one of the principal issues of mining in the country. The public authority should do a fundamental conveniences to complete mining tasks successfully, yet generally speaking, little mining organizations don't have great streets, absence of ordinary power and water supply. 

2. Deficient finance: The mining circle in Nigeria is constrained by little mining organizations which need satisfactory financing to foster their industry. The deficient stock is one of the basic issues of the mining business in Nigeria. A significant number of such organizations utilize unlawful methods and hardware to do their cycles.

3. Lack of precise land information The mining business in Nigeria deals with the issue of shortage of exact topographical information. The data on minerals amount and areas in Nigeria is lacking. There is as yet a significant reliance on information assumed control a long time back.

4. Lack of exceptional research centers Having exceptional labs is essential. They give proficient exploration to various minerals and mining items. It is particularly critical during investigations of the new mineral and handling to work on their quality. Tragically, to find a cutting edge exceptional lab in the mining business in our nation can turn into a difficult errand.

5. Lacking guideline Nigerian mining producing isn't directed accurately. It has made it open for unlawful mining. State authority endowed with dealing with this business is unprepared for the work.

See also

Artisanal mining
Blood diamond
Bootleg mining
Mining law
Sand theft

References

 
Environmental crime
Mining and the environment
Illegal occupations
Organized crime activity